Quartette is a Canadian country-folk group consisting of Cindy Church, Caitlin Hanford, Gwen Swick and Sylvia Tyson. Each of the four members also record as solo artists in addition to their work as a group.

History
The group was originally formed in 1993 and included Tyson, Hanford, Church and Colleen Peterson. 

In 1994 Quartette released a self-titled album, and later that year won a Canadian Country Music Association award for best vocal collaboration. 

In 1995 and 1996 they were nominated for Juno Awards in the category of best country group.

Peterson had toured and recorded with Quartette until early-1996, when she was diagnosed with cancer and being then unable to perform with the band during her cancer treatment, she chose her friend and collaborator Gwen Swick to fill in for her, and later died in Toronto on October 9 that year. She is interred in Little Lake Cemetery in Peterborough, Ontario.

All four current members of the group are also solo performers who have toured throughout Canada, having performed on Adrienne Clarkson Presents and at the Vancouver Folk Music Festival. 

Quartette's recordings and live performances have been reviewed favorably by The Globe and Mail, Chatelaine and Billboard.

At the end of 2016, Quartette continued to perform live, completing a month-long tour in December.

Discography

Albums

Singles

References

External links
 Quartette official website

Musical groups established in 1993
Musical groups from Toronto
Canadian country music groups
Vocal quartets
Country music supergroups
1993 establishments in Ontario